Meydan-e Vali Asr Metro Station is a station in line 3 of the Tehran Metro. It is located in Valiasr Square.

References

Tehran Metro stations